The following is a list of the television networks and announcers who have broadcast college football's Sun Bowl throughout the years.

Television

Radio

References

External links
Radio & Television Broadcasts (Archived)

Broadcasters
Sun
Sun Bowl
Sun Bowl
Sun Bowl
Sun Bowl